Acleris zeta is a species of moth of the family Tortricidae. It is found in China (Yunnan).

References

zeta
Moths of Asia
Moths described in 1964